Swarajya Janani Jijamata is an Indian Marathi television biopic drama premiered on 19 August 2019 airing on Sony Marathi.

Plot 
It is the story of Jijamata, mother of Maharashtra's idol Shivaji. It shows Jijamata's personal life since a young age and chaotic times she grew up in. The show takes us through all the phases of her life and  roles she played as a daughter, wife, mother and queen of swarajya.

Cast 
 Amol Kolhe as Shivaji
 Divesh Medge as Young Shivaji
 Neena Kulkarni as Elder Jijamata
 Amruta Pawar as Young Jijamata
 Bhargavi Chirmule as Young Jijamata
 Nishtha Vaidya as Child Jijamata
 Roshan Vichare as Shahaji
 Shantanu Moghe replacing Roshan as Shahaji
 Amit Tadwalkar as Afzal Khan
 Smita Shewale as Umabai
 Parineeta Pawaskar as Godatai
 Gauri Kiran as Soyarabai
 Swapnali Patil as Mhalsabai Jadhav (Jijamata's mother)
 Sneha Mangal as Bhagirathibai
 Sayali Sunil as Putalabai
 Vinay Hake as Moin Khan
 Amod Jande as Jagdevrao Jadhav (Jijamata's Uncle)
 Shripad Panase as Bajiprabhu Deshpande
 Monika Dabade as Shevanta / Sakina
 Priya Marathe as Raibagan

Production 
It is produced by Amol Kolhe under the banner of Jagdamb Creations.

Casting 
Amruta Pawar was selected for Middle age Jijamata. After few days Amruta quits the show and Bhargavi Chirmule reprising the role of Jijamata. After that Bhargavi also quits the show then, Neena Kulkarni was selected for Elder Jijamata. Amol Kolhe was cast in the role of Chhatrapati Shivaji.

References

External links 
 
 Swarajya Janani Jijamata at SonyLIV

Sony Marathi original programming
Indian historical television series
Indian period television series
Television series set in the 17th century
Marathi-language television shows
2019 Indian television series debuts
2021 Indian television series endings